Anti-Partition League may refer to:

 Unionist Anti-Partition League (1919–22), founded by St John Brodrick, 1st Earl of Midleton
 Anti-Partition League (1938–39), successor to the National League of the North
 Irish Anti-Partition League (1945–58), Northern Ireland nationalist party
 All Ireland Anti-Partition League (1948–50), political organisation based in Northern Ireland

See also
 Partition of Ireland
 Opposition to the partition of India